Katamatite East is a locality in Victoria, Australia in the local government area of the Shire of Moira. Cobram East borders the north of the locality, Katamatite borders the west and south of the locality, and Boosey borders the east of the locality.

References

Towns in Victoria (Australia)
Shire of Moira